Kiran Yamaji Lahamate is an Indian politician from Maharashtra. He was elected as Member of the Legislative Assembly from Akole Vidhan Sabha constituency reserved for Schedule Tribe in Ahmednagar. He received 112830 votes as a member of Nationalist Congress Party and defeated the Vaibhav Pichad of Bharatiya Janata Party.

References 

Year of birth missing (living people)
Living people
21st-century Indian women politicians
21st-century Indian politicians
Maharashtra MLAs 2019–2024
Nationalist Congress Party politicians from Maharashtra
Women members of the Maharashtra Legislative Assembly